The Space Review is a free online publication, published weekly with in-depth articles, essays, commentary and reviews on space exploration and development. It was founded in February 2003 by Jeff Foust, the current editor, publisher and regular writer.

Other regular writers include:
 John K. Strickland, National Space Society, Board of Directors
 Brian Weeden
 Dwayne A. Day
 Taylor Dinerman (deceased 2021)
 Sam Dinkin
 Anthony Young

The publication is known for its coverage of space tourism, as well as NASA and the satellite launch industry.

References

External links
 The Space Review

Free magazines
Magazines established in 2003
Online magazines published in the United States
Weekly magazines published in the United States
Science and technology magazines published in the United States